Armin Mašović (born 28 June 1993) is an Austrian footballer who plays as a midfielder for FC Bruck/Mur.

Club career
Born in Bruck an der Mur, Mašović played with Kapfenberger SV in the 2012–13 Austrian First League.  In summer 2013 he moved to SK Vorwärts Steyr playing a year and a half with them in the Austrian Regionalliga Central.  During the winter break of the 2014–15 season he left Austria for the first time and joined Serbian SuperLiga club FK Novi Pazar. By June 2019 he was playing with Bruck/Mur. His origin is from the serbian city Novi Pazar.

International career
Mašović played with the Austria U-19 in 2012.

References

External sources
 Armin Mašović at fussballoesterreich.at

1993 births
Living people
Austrian footballers
Austrian expatriate footballers
Association football midfielders
Kapfenberger SV players
SK Vorwärts Steyr players
FK Novi Pazar players
2. Liga (Austria) players
Expatriate footballers in Serbia
People from Bruck an der Mur
Footballers from Styria